Just Friends is an album led by saxophonist Joe Temperley and trombonist Jimmy Knepper which was recorded in 1978 and originally released on the Scottish Hep label. The album was rereleased on CD in 1994 along with Primrose Path as Special Relationship.

Track listing 
 "John's Bunch" (John Bunch) – 4:55
 "Stella By Starlight" (Victor Young, Ned Washington) – 4:45
 "Just in Time" (Jule Styne, Betty Comden, Adolph Green) – 4:25
 "Poor Butterfly"  (Raymond Hubbell, John Golden) – 3;50
 "Just Friends" (John Klenner, Sam M. Lewis) – 6:15
 "Yardbird Suite" (Charlie Parker) – 6:10
 "Aristocracy (of Jean Lafitte)" (Duke Ellington) – 5:22 
 "Sophisticated Lady" (Ellington) – 4:25
 "Lester Leaps In" (Lester Young) – 5:08

Personnel 
Joe Temperley – soprano saxophone, tenor saxophone, baritone saxophone
Jimmy Knepper – trombone
Derek Smith – piano
Michael Moore – bass
Billy Hart – drums

References 

Joe Temperley albums
Jimmy Knepper albums
1979 albums
Hep Records albums
Collaborative albums